Ravn Aero, formerly known as AirUSA, is an American defense contractor based at Quincy Regional Airport in Quincy, Illinois. It offers adversary air, close air support, Joint Terminal Attack Controller, and Intelligence, Surveillance, and Reconnaissance training to the United States Department of Defense.

Ravn Aero's first aircraft, a Czech Aero L-39 Albatros, was purchased in 1994. In 2019, Air USA was one of seven companies awarded an IDIQ contract to support the USAF's Combat Air Force Contract Air Support (CAF CAS) program in October 2019. In March 2020 the Australian Minister for Defence Industry Melissa Price announced that up to 46 ex-RAAF Hornets, as well as associated spare parts and test equipment inventory, would be sold to Air USA. In December 2021 the Australian Defence Magazine reported that the status of the Australian Hornet sale was "unknown".

Fleet 
As of April 2022, Air USA possesses or has purchased:

 4 Mikoyan MiG-29
 6 Aero L-39 Albatros
 10 BAE Systems Hawk 67 (formerly South Korean)
 5 Pilatus PC-9 (formerly Australian)
 17 Cessna T337 Turbo Skymaster
 10 Northrop F-5E Tiger II
 46 McDonnell Douglas F/A-18 Hornet (formerly Australian)

References 

Aerospace companies of the United States
American companies established in 1994
Companies based in Illinois
Defence companies